Perirhoe circumcincta is a species of sea snail, a marine gastropod mollusk in the family Terebridae, the auger snails.

Description

Distribution
This species is found in the western Pacific: in northern Australia, New Caledonia, and the North Island of New Zealand.

References

Terebridae
Gastropods described in 1857